Orthonevra brevicornis is a species of hoverfly.

References

Diptera of Europe
Eristalinae
Insects described in 1843
Taxa named by Hermann Loew